David Vogel Uihlein Jr.   is an American businessman, heir, and philanthropist.

Early life
His mother was Jane Bradley Pettit, a philanthropist. His maternal grandfather was Harry Lynde Bradley, co-founder of Allen-Bradley and the Bradley Foundation with his granduncle, Lynde Bradley. His father was David Vogel Uihlein Sr., heir to the Joseph Schlitz Brewing Company. His paternal great-grandfather was August Uihlein. His sister is Lynde Bradley Uihlein, a Democratic philanthropist.

Career
An architect, he is the president of Uihlein-Wilson Architects, a real estate company. He has served as vice chairman of the conservative Bradley Foundation since November 2006.

Philanthropy
He chairs the David & Julia Uihlein Charitable Foundation. He sits on the board of trustees of the Wisconsin Conservatory of Music.

Personal life
In June 1974, he married Julia Pickard Aring.

References

Living people
Year of birth missing (living people)
American architects
Architects from Milwaukee
Businesspeople from Milwaukee
American philanthropists
Uihlein Family